Highway 91A, or the Queensborough Connector, is a 3 km (2 mi) long spur off Highway 91. Highway 91A crosses the Queensborough Bridge and terminates at Marine Way, allowing traffic into New Westminster.  Residents of New Westminster can use Highway 91A as a convenient route towards the Canada/U.S. border. Although the Queensborough Bridge has existed since 1960, the highway spur section was opened only in 1986, at the same time the first section of Highway 91 was completed. (All of Highway 91A was once known as Highway 91 until the east-west portion of Highway 91 was built in the late 1980s; the route was redesignated as an alternate after that time.)

Highway 91A, in addition to being known as an extension of the Annacis Highway, is also known as the Queensborough Connector.

The junction of Highways 91 and 91A was converted to an interchange in the late 1990s.

The interchange with Marine Way was reconstructed in the late 2000s as part of a $211-million-dollar project to improve access to Lower Mainland border crossings. Median barriers were also installed on Highway 91A over the Queensborough Bridge, and the Howes Street intersection was upgraded to a full interchange.

Exit list 
The entirety of the route is in Metro Vancouver.

References

External links

 Official Numbered Routes in British Columbia

091A
091A
Freeways in British Columbia